Sickan Anna-Greta Carlsson (12 August 19152 November 2011) was a Swedish film and theatre actress and singer.

Biography 

From the 1930s to 1950s, Carlsson was Sweden's most popular film actress and its highest paid, topping the salary of even the most popular male performer. She was also an accomplished singer and recording artist and performed on stage and in musical revues.
She was noted for her comedic films, which peaked during World War II. Several of her films from this period include upbeat musical numbers intended to raise the morale of her war-weary audiences. The characters she portrayed in the post-war years were often more complex than those she had played previously and featured less of her singing talents. Her screen persona was that of a carefree, energetic young woman who faced everyday problems with optimism. Her films were immensely popular and often had long runs in theaters.

Carlsson is most closely associated with two directors: Schamyl Bauman (in films from 1945 to 1955) and Hasse Ekman (1956–65). Although remembered mostly for her light-hearted roles, she was also able to portray darker characters when called upon. One of her best known dramatic outings was in 1961's Lustgården (aka The Pleasure Garden), with a script written specifically for her by Ingmar Bergman.

Carlsson stated publicly that she did not mind being typecast in comedic roles, however, and is proud to have been given parts which allowed her the opportunity to make her audiences laugh. Some of her best films are Det glada kalaset (1946), Skolka skolan (1948), Klasskamrater (1952), Sjunde himlen (1956) and Lustgården (1961).

Marriages 
Born into a working-class family, she fought to be accepted in an upper-class environment and endured two broken marriages before wedding businessman Sölve Adamsson which ended with his death in 1987. Her first marriage, to Gösta Reuter, produced a daughter, Ingegärd.

Later years 
In 2005 she was awarded an Honorary Guldbagge Award at the Guldbagge Awards in Sweden.

Selected filmography 

 A Stolen Waltz (1932) - Aina
 Jag gifta mig - aldrig (1932) - Maid (uncredited)
 Dear Relatives (1933) - Marianne Friis
 The Song to Her (1934) - Märta Holm
 Simon of Backabo (1934) - Greta
 Kärlek efter noter (1935) - Ingrid Blomkvist
 The People of Småland (1935) - Inga Blomgren
 Russian Flu (1937) - Bojan
 Klart till drabbning (1937) - Britta Birke
 Oh, Such a Night! (1937) - Irma Berggren
 Thunder and Lightning (1938) - Pyret Hanson, balettflicka
 Just a Bugler (1938) - Gertrud Brinkman
 Nothing But the Truth (1939) - Märta Lund
 Landstormens lilla Lotta (1939) - Elsa Strid
 Oh, What a Boy! (1939) - Eva Blomberg
Gentleman att hyra (1940)  - Claire Wanner
 Landstormens lilla argbigga (1941) - Marianne Norrenius
 Tonight or Never (1941) - Margit Holm
 Flickan i fönstret mitt emot (1942) - Ingrid Linder
 Löjtnantshjärtan (1942) - Louise Pålsson
 A Girl for Me (1943) - Vera Lanner
 Hans officiella fästmö (1944) - Monica Brandt
 The Green Lift (1944) - Lillan
 The Girls in Smaland (1945) - Christina Larsson
 Det glada kalaset (1946) - Britt Granvik
 Wedding Night (1947) - Yvonne
 Pappa sökes (1947) - Mary Broberg
 Life at Forsbyholm Manor 1948) - Britt Lange
 Playing Truant (1949) - Margareta Carlson-Kronberg
 Jungfrun på Jungfrusund (1949) - Ingrid, maid
 My Sister and I (1950) - Katarina Hassel / Birgitta Hassel
 Teacher's First Born (1950) - Sonja Broberg, journalist
 My Name Is Puck (1951) - Puck Andersson
 One Fiancée at a Time (1952) - Lillian 'Lillan' Carlberg
 Classmates (1952) - Anna-Greta Wallin
 Dance on Roses (1954) - Marianne Molin
 Darling of Mine (1955) - Ingrid Billberg
 Seventh Heaven (1956) - Lovisa Sundelius, underläkare
 The Halo Is Slipping (1957) - Birgitta Lövgren
You Are My Adventure (1958) - Lena Bergström
 Fröken Chic (1959) - Isabella Linder
 Heaven and Pancake (1959) - Lovisa Sundelius
 The Pleasure Garden (1961) - Fanny, Waitress
 Niklasons (1965, TV Series) - Elisabeth Niklason
 Andersson's Kalle (1972) - Anderssonskan
 Bröllopet (1973) - Birgit Strid
 Andersson's Kalle on Top Form (1973) - Anderssonskan
 Charlotte Löwensköld (1979) - Regina Forsius, Rural Dean's Wife
 Öbergs på Lillöga (1983, TV Series) - Britta
 Kusiner i kubik (1992, TV Series) - Margot, Bengt's mother

Source and references 
Carlsson, Sickan; Sickan (autobiography), Bonniers, Stockholm, Sweden, 1977.
Holm, Crick; På tu man hand med filmidoler (chapter Sickan Carlsson), Medéns, Stockholm, Sweden, 1947.

Further reading

External links

Obituary – Dagens Nyheter (Swedish)

1915 births
2011 deaths
Singers from Stockholm
Swedish film actresses
Swedish women singers
Actresses from Stockholm